The WCT Tallinn Mens Challenger, also known as the Tallinn Mens International Challenger, and the Tallinn Season Starter is an annual tournament on the men's World Curling Tour.  It is held annually on the last weekend of September at the Tondiraba Ice Hall in Tallinn, Estonia.  

The purse for the event is €3,000, with the winning team receiving €1,200. 

The event has been held since 2015, and has been part of the World Curling Tour since 2017. 

The 2022 event included 18 teams from 11 countries, including Norway, Spain, Poland, Latvia, Italy, Estonia, the Netherlands, Scotland, Sweden, Switzerland and Ukraine.

Champions

References

World Curling Tour events
Curling competitions in Estonia
Sports competitions in Tallinn